Jenkins House may refer to:

in the United States
(by state, then city)

Jenkins Farmhouse, Dupree, Alabama, listed on the National Register of Historic Places (NRHP) in Lee County, Alabama
Jenkins Farm and House, Loxley, Alabama, listed on the NRHP in Baldwin County, Alabama
Jenkins House (West Palm Beach, Florida)
Israel Jenkins House, Marion, Indiana, listed on the NRHP in Grant County, Indiana
Dr. George A. Jenkins House, Albia, Iowa, listed on the NRHP in Monroe County, Iowa
Jenkins-Berkshire House, Petersburg, Kentucky, listed on the NRHP in Boone County, Kentucky
Charles W. Jenkins House, Bangor, Maine, listed on the NRHP in Penobscot County, Maine
Benjamin Jenkins House, Andover, Massachusetts, listed on the NRHP in Massachusetts
John Jenkins Homestead, Barnstable, Massachusetts, listed on the NRHP in Massachusetts
Joseph Jenkins House, Barnstable, Massachusetts, listed on the NRHP in Massachusetts
Jenkins-Whelden Farmstead, Barnstable, Massachusetts, listed on the NRHP in Massachusetts
Franklin B. Jenkins House (35 Chestnut Street, Stoneham, Massachusetts), listed on the NRHP in Massachusetts
Franklin B. Jenkins House (2 Middle Street, Stoneham, Massachusetts), listed on the NRHP in Massachusetts
 Jenkins House (Delanson, New York), listed on the NRHP in New York
Jenkins-Perry House, Milan, Ohio, listed on the NRHP in Erie County, Ohio
Gov. William W. Jenkins Homestead Site, Newkirk, Oklahoma, listed on the NRHP in Kay County, Oklahoma
Belle Ainsworth Jenkins Estate, Beaverton, Oregon, listed on the NRHP in Washington County, Oregon
Jenkins-Mead House, Morristown, New Jersey, listed on the NRHP in Morris County, New Jersey
Jenkins Octagon House, Duanesburg, New York, listed on the NRHP in New York
David Jenkins House, Gastonia, North Carolina, listed on the NRHP in Gaston County, North Carolina
Jenkins Homestead, Lansdale, Pennsylvania, listed on the NRHP in Montgomery County, Pennsylvania
Mary Jenkins Community Praise House, Frogmore, South Carolina, listed on the NRHP in Beaufort County, South Carolina
Fowler-Jenkins House, Bastrop, Texas, listed on the NRHP in Bastrop County, Texas
 Jenkins House (Bastrop, Texas), listed on the NRHP in Texas
Edward J. Jenkins House, Bryan, Texas, listed on the NRHP in Brazos County, Texas
Edwin and Mary Jenkins House, Paris, Texas, listed on the NRHP in Lamar County, Texas
Joseph J. Jenkins House, Park City, Utah, listed on the NRHP in Summit County, Utah
Gen. Albert Gallatin Jenkins House, Green Bottom, West Virginia, listed on the NRHP in Cabell County, West Virginia
Halbert D. Jenkins House, Whitefish Bay, Wisconsin, listed on the NRHP in Milwaukee County, Wisconsin

See also
Franklin B. Jenkins House (disambiguation)